Barrie Clarke was a Canadian professional football manager who was the head coach of the Canada men's national team.

References

External links
 

1932 births
Living people
People from Ilkeston
Sportspeople from Derbyshire
Canada men's national soccer team managers
Canadian soccer coaches